Zoltán Trepák (born 20 February 1977) is a Hungarian former professional basketball player.

Career
He started to play basketball in Csepel, but after one year the team disappeared from the sport field, he went to Szombathely to Falco KC. He spent there three years, then he played four years in Szolnok. After these years, he contracted to Kaposvár for three years. Still during the Szolnok years played first in the national team, in 2001. After six years he played again there, now he is a 15 times national player. After Kaposvár he played in Nyíregyháza, between 2006 and 2008, in 2008 he went to Zalaegerszeg.

10 January 2008 he played his best in the cup match against the Slovakian Spišská Nová Ves, he got 28 points

External links
 Zoltán Trepák's profile on the kosarlabda.com
 Zoltán Trepák's profile on the eurobasket.com
 Trepák Zoltán contracted to Nyíregyháza
 Three faces of Zoltán Trepák (pictures)

References

1977 births
Living people
Basketball players from Budapest
Centers (basketball)
Hungarian men's basketball players
Kaposvári KK players
Power forwards (basketball)
Soproni KC players
Szolnoki Olaj KK players